Charles Robert Summerhayes (1 September 1860 – 2 October 1948) was an Australian architect, builder and politician, who served on the Ryde Municipal Council, including several terms as mayor.

Biography
Summerhayes was first elected as an alderman for the West Ward on the Ryde Municipal Council in February 1905.

Summerhayes died age 88 at his long-time residence, "Womerah" in Eastwood, survived by his seven children.

Key works
 Terrace Group, 16–34 Gibbes Street, Newtown, New South Wales (1896)
 Bombara, Stanmore Road, Stanmore, New South Wales (1897)
 Holy Trinity Greek Orthodox Church, Surry Hills, New South Wales (1898; altered 1931)
 Womerah, Trelawney Street, Eastwood, New South Wales (1905)
 St Philip's Anglican Church, Eastwood, New South Wales (1907)
 Summerhayes Shops Group, Rowe Street, Eastwood, New South Wales (c. 1920)
 Duke of York Theatre (Odeon Eastwood), Rowe Street, Eastwood, New South Wales (1927; demolished 1973).
 Eastwood Park Grandstand, Eastwood, New South Wales (1933)
 Ryde Park Rotunda, Ryde Park, Ryde, New South Wales (1934)

References

Further reading

1860 births
1948 deaths
Australian ecclesiastical architects
Federation architects
19th-century Australian architects
20th-century Australian architects
Mayors of Ryde
20th-century Australian politicians